The Zeitschrift für deutsches Altertum und deutsche Literatur (commonly abbreviated ZfdA) is a quarterly peer-reviewed academic journal in the field of German studies with emphasis on the older periods. It was established in 1841 and is the oldest periodical in early Germanic studies still publishing.

History 
The journal was established in 1841 by Moriz Haupt as the Zeitschrift für deutsches Alterthum (older spelling) with the objective of applying the same rigour to the philology and textual criticism of medieval German texts as was already current with Greek and Latin.

With volume 13 (1867) the Zeitschrift für deutsches Alterthum began a new series. In 1876, with volume 19 (New Series 7) its name was changed to the present Zeitschrift für deutsches Altertum und deutsche Literatur and a supplement, the Anzeiger, began publication as a journal of reviews; this sometimes overshadowed the parent journal.

The journal has appeared in quarterly issues since 1931. It was originally published by the Weidmannsche Buchhandlung, first in Leipzig, from 1856 in Berlin. With the third issue of volume 82 (1948/50), Franz Steiner Verlag took over publication. The current publisher is S. Hirzel Verlag.

Since volume 140 (2011) the editor-in-chief has been Jürgen Wolf (University of Marburg).

Editors 
 1841 – 1874: Moriz Haupt (only 16 volumes appeared)
 1874 – 1883: Karl Müllenhoff and Elias von Steinmeyer
 1874 – 1890: Elias von Steinmeyer
 1891 – 1926: Gustav Roethe and Edward Schröder
 1926 – 1931: Edward Schröder
 1932 – 1938: Edward Schröder and Arthur Hübner
 1939 – 1955: Julius Schwietering
 1956 – 1963: Julius Schwietering and Friedrich Ohly
 1963 – 1969: Friedrich Ohly
 1969 – 1985: Kurt Ruh
 1986 – 1997: Franz Josef Worstbrock
 1998 – 2010: Joachim Heinzle
 2011 – present: Jürgen Wolf

Editorial philosophy 
Haupt wrote a statement of purpose in the first issue in which he set out the journal's range: "the literature, language, customs, legal history [and] belief of German antiquity". The major focus from the beginning was publishing editions of Old and Middle High German works, which were presented for the most part for an academic readership, without explanatory material. The journal "quickly became the most important academic forum for the 'Berlin school'". In reaction to the narrowness of its approach, a quarterly named Germania was founded by Franz Pfeiffer in 1856, with the objective of reflecting the broader approach of Jacob Grimm and of classical philology and of therefore laying a greater emphasis on articles than editions. The foundation of the Zeitschrift für deutsche Philologie in 1868 was also a reaction to the ZfdA'''s restricted focus, in its case intended to supplement it. For at least a century, this emphasis on philology and relatively few changes of editor left the Zeitschrift für deutsches Altertum und deutsche Literatur largely untouched by changes in opinion in the field. Until the end of World War II, the editor was traditionally the Chairman of the Faculty of Germanistik'' at the University of Berlin. It was a relatively impersonal publication, sometimes accused of arrogance, and did not even include death notices for many decades.

References

External links
 
 Zeitschrift für deutsches Alterthum, volume 1 (1841) – New Series volume 6 (volume 18, 1875) online at DigiZeitschriften
 Zeitschrift für deutsches Altertum und deutsche Literatur, New Series volume 7 (volume 19, 1876) – volume 136 (2007) online at DigiZeitschriften

Quarterly journals
Cultural journals
Publications established in 1841
German-language journals
Germanic philology journals